Muang Pa is a town in Sainyabuli Province, Laos. It is located to the northeast of Muang Saiapoun and northwest of Muong Liep. There is a high school to the southwest of the town.

References

Populated places in Sainyabuli Province